is a railway station on the Jōban Line in the city of Iwaki, Fukushima, Japan, operated by East Japan Railway Company (JR East).

Lines

Station layout
Yumoto Station has one island platform and one side platform connected to the station building by a footbridge. The station has a Midori no Madoguchi staffed ticket office.

Platforms

History
Yumoto Station opened on 25 February 1897. The present station building was completed in March 1967. The station was absorbed into the JR East network upon the privatization of the Japanese National Railways (JNR) on 1 April 1987. A new station building was completed in November 2014.

Passenger statistics
In fiscal 2018, the station was used by an average of 2021 passengers daily (boarding passengers only).

Surrounding area
 Iwaki Yumoto onsen
 Spa Resort Hawaiians
 Iwaki Coal and Fossil Museum
Iwaki Post Office

See also
 List of railway stations in Japan

References

External links

   

Stations of East Japan Railway Company
Railway stations in Fukushima Prefecture
Jōban Line
Railway stations in Japan opened in 1897
Iwaki, Fukushima